Force 2  is a 2016 Indian Hindi-language action thriller film directed by Abhinay Deo, which features John Abraham, Tahir Raj Bhasin and Sonakshi Sinha in the lead roles. It is a sequel to the 2011 film Force, and the second installment of the Force film series. Principal photography of the film commenced in August 2015, and the film was released on 18 November 2016. Upon release, the film received positive reviews.

Plot

The film opens with a montage in China, where RAW agents are dropping dead like flies. One of the victims is Harish, Additional Commissioner Of Police Officer Yash / Yashvardhan Singh best friend. Before being killed, Harish mails a book to his friend Yash, passing on an important coded message.

When Yash receives the book, he learns of a conspiracy that has been set in motion, targeting only RAW agents. When he takes the book and the clues to the RAW headquarters, the agency understands the legitimacy of the situation and puts Yash in charge of tracking down the conspirer. He is teamed with another RAW agent, KK, and together they track down the culprit in the Indian embassy of Budapest.

The mastermind of this conspiracy against RAW agents is Shiv Sharma, a nerdy hacker who is planning something bigger. In Budapest, a cat and mouse chase begins between Shiv and KK and Yash; they come close to nabbing him several times, but he always proves to be a step ahead. Multiple chase sequences ensue, but each time, Shiv manages to escape.

While digging into Shiv's past for more information, ACP Yash learns that Shiv is actually a pseudonym used by this terrorist to mask his real identity as Rudra Pratap Singh – the son of RAW agent Karan Pratap Singh, who had been sacrificed in an operation years ago. Rudra was left broken after minister Brijesh Verma branded Karan and several other RAW agents as traitors, and Rudra's mother committed suicide.

Yash learns that Rudra is now seeking revenge from RAW for betraying Karan. Eventually, in an assembly in Budapest, Rudra gears up to shoot Brijesh. But KK and Yash reach there in time and kill him before he can do harm. But before he can die, Yash forces Brijesh to accept his mistakes in front of the media, clearing Karan's name. Rudra dies in peace hearing this. 
Movie ends with Yash seeing his deceased beloved wife's presence (played by Genelia in first part of Force),whom he loves the utmost, appreciating him and suggesting that he date KK.

Cast

John Abraham as Additional Commissioner Of Police Officer Yashvardhan ″Yash″ Singh  
Sonakshi Sinha as Kamaljeet Kaur aka K.K. 
Tahir Raj Bhasin as Shiv Sharma(fake name) & Rudra Pratap Singh (Real name)
Narendra Jha as RAW Head Anjan Das
Adil Hussain as HRD Minister Brijesh Verma
Vikram Kapadia as Naren Kaushik
Patricia Mittler as Martinez
Genelia D'Souza as Maya Yashwardhan Singh, Yash's wife as a spirit (cameo appearance)
Raj Babbar as Zonal Director of Intelligence Bureau (cameo appearance)
Freddy Daruwala as RAW agent Harish (cameo appearance)
Boman Irani as Karan Pratap Singh, Rudra's father and a former RAW agent (cameo appearance)
Shubhangi Latkar as Rudra's mother who commits suicide. (cameo appearance)
Additionally, Mohnish Behl as Atul Kalsekar (whose character Atul dies in Force) makes a photographic cameo appearance in one of the group photos in Yash's apartment.

Reception

Critical reception
On review aggregator Rotten Tomatoes, the film holds an approval rating of 63%, based on 8 reviews with an average rating of 5/10. India Today and The Times of India gave the film 3 stars out of 5. Mid-Day and The Hindustan Times gave the film 2 stars out of 5.

Box office
The film has grossed  66 million on its first day, becoming John Abraham's highest opening grosser. The film faced problems due to demonetization which was active at the time of its release and grossed  44.20 crore in India and 526.0 million worldwide.

Soundtrack

The film score was composed by Prasad Sashte, who had earlier composed the score of Holiday: A Soldier Is Never Off Duty. The lyrics have been written by Kumaar and Rashmi Virag, and the songs have been composed by Gourov Roshin and Amaal Mallik. Its first song, Rang Laal, which is sung by Dev Negi, John Abraham and Aditi Singh Sharma was released on 21 October 2016 . The full soundtrack was released on 27 October 2016.

Game
An official game based on the film has been launched after the release of the film by Hungama Digital Media.

References

External links
 
 
 

2016 films
2010s Hindi-language films
Indian action thriller films
Films shot in Hungary
Films shot in London
Films shot in Delhi
Indian nonlinear narrative films
Intelligence Bureau (India) in fiction
Fictional portrayals of the Maharashtra Police
Films about the Research and Analysis Wing
Viacom18 Studios films
Indian sequel films
2016 action thriller films
Films directed by Abhinay Deo